John Loring may refer to:

John Loring (died 1808), Royal Navy officer
John Wentworth Loring (1775–1852), Royal Navy officer
John Loring (designer) (born 1939), American designer and author
John Alden Loring (1871–1947), American naturalist